was a village located in Kitauonuma District, Niigata Prefecture, Japan.

As of 2003, the village had an estimated population of 1,907 and a density of 7.01 persons per km2. The total area was 272.14 km2.

On November 1, 2004, Irihirose, along with the towns of Horinouchi and Koide, and the villages of Hirokami, Sumon and Yunotani (all from Kitauonuma District), was merged to create the city of Uonuma.

Transportation

Railway
 JR East - Tadami Line
  -  -

Highway

See also
 Uonuma

External links
 Uonuma Tourist Association  

Dissolved municipalities of Niigata Prefecture
Uonuma, Niigata